Winfield Scott (1786–1866) was a United States Army general and presidential candidate.

Winfield Scott may also refer to:

 Winfield Scott (chaplain) (1837–1910), United States Army chaplain
 Winfield Scott Schley (1839–1911), rear admiral in the United States Navy and the hero of the Battle of Santiago de Cuba during the Spanish–American War.
 Winfield Townley Scott (1910–1968), American poet, critic and diarist
 Winfield Scott (songwriter) (1920–2015), American songwriter
 Winfield W. Scott Jr. (1927-2022), United States Air Force general, superintendent of the U.S. Air Force Academy
 Winfield W. Scott III (1952-), United States Air Force general, commander of the Tanker Airlift Control Center

Other
 Winfield Scott (ship), a list of ships

See also
 Winfield Scott Hancock, United States Army General